Kittle is an unincorporated community in southeastern Fulton County, Arkansas, United States. The community is located on Arkansas Highway 289, just north of U.S. Route 412. The west end of the Cherokee Village is just to the northeast.

References

Unincorporated communities in Fulton County, Arkansas
Unincorporated communities in Arkansas